Esker Fax from Esker is a Windows server-based fax server solution that allows fax processing transmission and reception from both desktop clients and host applications.

Product description

Desktop users can both send and receive faxes via the Esker Fax server using their own email client, via their web browser using the Document Manager web interface or by utilising the stand-alone Esker Universal Fax Client.

The server is also capable of integration with host applications to automate the faxing of business documents such as purchase orders, reports, and invoices directly from the host application.

Transmission and reception can be based on standard Class 2 / 2.0 modem devices, CAPI devices such as the Eicon Diva Server, Cantata Fax hardware or by utilising Eskers own devices with the Fax on Demand Connector. Support is included for Analogue, Basic Rate ISDN and Primary Rate ISDN transmission and reception.

References
Small Business Computing - December 2006
Let Your Documents Fly
eWeek - December 2006
Whirlpool Soothes Highs and Lows
Manufacturing Business Technology - October 2006
The rebirth of knowledge management
KM World - September 2006
Intelligent data capture: a trend only beginning
Computerworld - May 2006
Paper cuts: Renewed efforts in the move toward the paperless office]
IT Jungle - March 2006
Esker Upgrades Content Management System
Digital Publishing Solutions - March 2006
Is the technology finally here to automate the process and reduce the paper burden?
Inside eWEEK Labs - September 2005
I Dream of Salesforce

See also
Fax server

External links
Esker Fax Home Page
Esker Fax for SAP 

Fax software